Diadelia interrupta is a species of beetle in the family Cerambycidae. It was described by Fairmaire in 1896.

References

Diadelia
Beetles described in 1896